Simon Cottle (born 18 September 1975) is a British rower. He competed in the men's quadruple sculls event at the 2004 Summer Olympics.

References

External links
 

1975 births
Living people
British male rowers
Olympic rowers of Great Britain
Rowers at the 2004 Summer Olympics
Sportspeople from Chester